Vatamanu is a surname. Notable people with the surname include:

 Alexandru Vatamanu, Romanian sports shooter
 Ion Vatamanu (1937–1993), Moldovan writer and politician
 Vasile Vatamanu (died 2011), Moldovan politician